Hussain Sahrab (born 23 March 1993) is an Emirati footballer. He currently plays as a goalkeeper .

Career
He formerly played for Al-Shaab, Masfout, and Al-Arabi.

References

External links
 

1993 births
Living people
Emirati footballers
Al-Shaab CSC players
Masfout Club players
Al-Arabi SC (UAE) players
UAE Pro League players
UAE First Division League players
Association football goalkeepers
Place of birth missing (living people)